is a train station on the Minobu Line of Central Japan Railway Company (JR Central) located in city of Kōfu, Yamanashi Prefecture, Japan.

Lines
Kai-Sumiyoshi Station is served by the Minobu Line and is located 83.1 kilometers from the southern terminus of the line at Fuji Station.

Layout
Kai-Sumiyoshi Station has one side platform serving a single bi-directional track. The station is unattended.

Adjacent stations

History
Kai-Sumiyoshi Station was opened on April 1, 1931 as a signal stop on the Fuji-Minobu Line. It was elevated to a full station on October 1, 1938. The line came under control of the Japanese Government Railways on May 1, 1941. The JGR became the JNR (Japan National Railway) after World War II. Along with the division and privatization of JNR on April 1, 1987, the station came under the control of the Central Japan Railway Company.

Surrounding area
 Kōfu Minami High School

See also
 List of railway stations in Japan

External links

   Minobu Line station information

Railway stations in Japan opened in 1938
Railway stations in Yamanashi Prefecture
Minobu Line
Kōfu, Yamanashi